Council Regulation (EC) No 2157/2001 of 8 October 2001 on the Statute for a European company (SE) is an EU law requiring member states to recognise the European Company as capable of being registered in each member state.

See also
EU law
Societas Europaea
Employee Involvement Directive 2001/86/EC
European company law

External links
Council Regulation (EC) No 2157/2001 of 8 October 2001 on the Statute for a European company (SE)
Consolidated version of 1 July 2013

European Union regulations